Family Classic Tales is an animated literature series that is produced by Air Programs International (API). These cartoons were later aired on CBS. This series is similar to Famous Classic Tales.

References

CBS original programming
American children's animated anthology television series